Hannover Messe/Laatzen station is a Category 4 station in the German town of Laatzen near the Hanover fairground. It is normally served only by the Hanover S-Bahn. During major events such as CeBIT and Hanover Messe, all passing regional and long distance trains stop at the station. The station opened in 2000, replacing the old Messe station, which was located on a spur line in the fairgrounds.

History 
The station was built for Expo 2000. It replaced Messe station at Laatzen, which was built in 1977 during the construction of the Hanover–Würzburg high-speed line, which had in turn replaced the former suburban railway station of Hannover-Wülfel on the Hanoverian Southern Railway.

The Hannover-Messe station was a terminal station on the fairground site that it served until 1998, having been expanded again in 1988.

The new station was designed following a competition for planning ideas advertised throughout Europe. It was officially open on 22 March 2000. The first of two stages went into operation in the spring of 1998, following the start of construction in 1996. A total of €200 million was invested in the project, which included the installation of 30 new sets of points and 61 additional signals. As part of Expo 2000 133,000 passengers per day were expected to travel to and from the site in 300 long distance and regional trains and 250 S-Bahn trains.

A 60 m long and 36 m wide concrete bridge spans across the tracks, which is covered by a roof supported by curved steel trusses. This gives access to the platforms via covered fingers, which serve as roofs to the platform and have several exits to it.

The Messe station has two 420 m long and 9 metre wide long-distance platforms serving  four running lines and a 210 m long terminal platform with two tracks for the S-Bahn line, which ends there. Two other non-stop tracks for the Hanover–Würzburg high-speed line run between the tracks serving the long-distance platforms.

During Expo 2000 there was a temporary Terminal B located northeast of the station on the existing tracks; this was used as a terminus for services to and from the north and east. These platforms were dismantled after Expo 2000 finished.

Normal Operations 

Hannover-Messe/Laatzen station has been served since December 2008 by the S-Bahn, with services running every hour on line 4. Previously it had been served by an hourly Regionalbahn services on the Hanover–Hildesheim route and a two hourly metronom service on the Uelzen–Hanover–Göttingen route. Since 10 December 2017, LOC 1818 and LOC 1819 of the private operator Locomore has also stopped at this station. Locomore connects the Hanover region with Berlin, Frankfurt and Stuttgart.

Operations during major trade fairs 
When major trade fairs like CeBIT and Hannover Messe are open, the station also serves as a long-distance station, giving a direct connection to the fairgrounds (CeBIT 2010 was served daily for up to 72 Intercity-Express and 15 Intercity trains and additional regional trains). S-Bahn line 4 towards Bennemühlen is reinforced so that it runs at 30-minute intervals. Furthermore, S-Bahn line 8 operates as a direct connection via Hannover Hauptbahnhof to Hannover airport.

Connections

The 340-metre-long skywalk bridge connects the station and the fair ground. This is an elevated double tube in which two parallel walkways allow a rapid, two-way and all-weather pedestrian link.

There is a link to the Laatzen/Birkenstraße station on the Hanover Stadtbahn lines 1 and 2, which is located about 200 metres away on Hildesheimer Straße. Next to the station is a stop on bus routes 340 and 341, which only run hourly.

References

External links 

Railway stations in Lower Saxony
Hannover S-Bahn stations
Buildings and structures in Hanover Region
Railway stations in Germany opened in 2000